Clinton State Park is a public recreation area located on the north shore of Clinton Lake at the western edge of Lawrence, Kansas, United States.

The  state park lies on the north shore of Clinton Lake, known for its clear water and good channel catfish, walleye, and crappie fishing.

Visitors will find a large number of bird species that vary with the seasons.

An extensive hiking/biking trail system make this park and adjacent  wildlife area an attractive destination for outdoors enthusiasts including hikers, nature photographers, mountain bicyclists, wildflower enthusiasts, wildlife observers, and even cross-country skiers.

Park staff work closely with Lawrence and University of Kansas individuals and organizations to present several concerts and other special events each year. The park is the former to host the Wakarusa Music and Camping Festival. Since 2008, Clinton State Park is the annual site of the Ironman Kansas 70.3 triathlon. The swim portion of the competition is held in Clinton Lake, and the run portion of the competition occurs on the park campgrounds and roads.

See also
 List of Kansas state parks
 List of lakes, reservoirs, and dams in Kansas
 List of rivers of Kansas

References

External links
Clinton State Park Kansas Department of Wildlife, Parks and Tourism
Clinton State Park Map Kansas Department of Wildlife, Parks and Tourism
https://www.ksbirds.org/checklist/Douglas.pdf

State parks of Kansas
Protected areas of Douglas County, Kansas
Triathlon venues